Glaucoclystis sinuosoides is a moth in the family Geometridae. It is found on Borneo. The habitat consists of lowland dipterocarp forests.

References

Moths described in 1997
Eupitheciini